Denny Zeitlin (born April 10, 1938) is an American jazz pianist, composer, and clinical professor of psychiatry at University of California, San Francisco. Since 1963, he has recorded more than 100 compositions and was a first-place winner in the DownBeat International Jazz Critics' Poll in 1965 and 1974. He composed the soundtrack for the 1978 science-fiction horror film Invasion of the Body Snatchers.

Early life
Zeitlin was born in Chicago, Illinois, and grew up in the Chicago suburb of Highland Park. He began improvising on the piano at the age of two. His father was a radiologist who played piano by ear. His mother was a speech pathologist and his first piano teacher. He began formal study in classical music at the age of six, switching to jazz in the eighth grade. In high school, he played professionally in and around Chicago, and by college at the University of Illinois at Urbana–Champaign, was playing with Ira Sullivan, Johnny Griffin, Wes Montgomery, Joe Farrell, Wilbur Ware, and Bob Cranshaw, among others. Mentors included pianist Billy Taylor and George Russell. Pianist Bill Evans, an early supporter, frequently recorded Zeitlin's composition "Quiet Now" and made it the title track of a 1970 album.

Later life and career
Signed by Columbia Records's John Hammond, Zeitlin began his recording career in 1963 while studying medicine at Johns Hopkins University School of Medicine, debuting as the featured pianist on the Jeremy Steig album Flute Fever, which also featured Ben Riley and Ben Tucker. Zeitlin's recording debut as a leader was the album Cathexis, with bassist Cecil McBee and drummer Freddie Waits. Zeitlin then moved to San Francisco in 1964 to intern at the University of California, San Francisco, followed by a residency. His next album was Carnival, with bassist Charlie Haden and drummer Jerry Granelli. That trio had a regular gig at The Trident in Sausalito, California, and recorded Zeitlin's next album, Shining Hour, there.

Jazz critic Leonard Feather called Zeitlin "the most versatile young pianist to come to prominence in the early 1960s". Reflecting on Zeitlin's Columbia period, jazz historian Ted Gioia wrote that the pianist "had assimilated the breakthroughs of the previous decade, from the impressionism of Bill Evans to the free-fall explorations of Ornette Coleman, and blended them into a personal style that anticipated the next fifteen years of keyboard advances. He stood out from the crowd for the unbridled creativity of his work, the richness of his harmonic palette, and the sheer beauty of his piano tone".

Between 1968 and 1978, Zeitlin integrated electronic keyboards, synthesizers, and sound-altering devices with acoustic instruments, working in multiple musical genres. The results were first heard in 1969 when Zeitlin composed and performed music for the "Jazzy Spies" sequences on the first season of Sesame Street, featuring vocal overdubs by Grace Slick. In 1973, he released Expansion, a trio album with George Marsh and Mel Graves, which DownBeat magazine awarded its highest rating. The period culminated with Zeitlin's writing the score for the 1978 remake of Invasion of the Body Snatchers, which turned out to be his only film score, despite numerous subsequent offers, because of the extreme workload of many 20-plus-hour days. While New Yorker film critic Pauline Kael thought the music occasionally overpowered the action, she called the score "generally dazzling" and a large contributor to both the humor and terror of the film.

Beginning in 1978, Zeitlin focused primarily on acoustic music, continuing to play concerts internationally and recording some 22 albums. His projects included the solo album Soundings, the duo album Time Remembers One Time Once with Charlie Haden, and Denny Zeitlin Trio in Concert with bassist Buster Williams and drummer Matt Wilson. Zeitlin continued to draw strong reviews. Critic Doug Ramsey wrote that "Trio in Concert", released in 2009, "catches Dr. Zeitlin, at age 70, in his musical prime and his trio afire". He recorded his 2020 album, Live at Mezzrow, at age 82,

Dual careers
Since 1968, Zeitlin has been on the teaching faculty at the University of California, San Francisco, where he is clinical professor of psychiatry. He has a private practice in San Francisco and Marin County.  He had a 30-year mentorship with psychoanalyst Joseph Weiss, founder of Control Mastery Theory. Zeitlin has combined his two disciplines in a lecture and workshop entitled "Unlocking the Creative Impulse: The Psychology of Improvisation".

In comparing his two careers, Zeitlin has said it would be a mistake to think that psychiatry served merely to support his passion for music, when in fact he has a passion for both. "In each setting, communication is utterly paramount. There has to be a depth of empathy that allows you to really inhabit the other person's world. It comes out as a collaborative journey in both settings."

Personal life 
Zeitlin lives in Marin County, California, is an avid mountain biker and wine aficionado, the latter interest shared with his trio. He has been married to actress Josephine Shady since 1969.

Discography

As leader/co-leader

As sideman
 David Friesen, Other Times Other Places (Global Pacific, 1989)
 David Friesen, Two for the Show (Summit, 2000)
 David Grisman, Dawg Duos (Acoustic Disc, 1999)
 Jeremy Steig, Flute Fever (Columbia, 1963)

References

External links
Official site
 

1938 births
Living people
American film score composers
American jazz pianists
American male pianists
Musicians from Chicago
Columbia Records artists
20th-century American pianists
Jazz musicians from Illinois
21st-century American pianists
American male film score composers
20th-century American male musicians
21st-century American male musicians
American male jazz musicians
Sunnyside Records artists
Concord Records artists
Windham Hill Records artists
ECM Records artists